Dominique Demers (born 23 November 1956) is a French-Canadian novelist, best renowned for her Mlle Charlotte novel series. She holds a PhD in children's literature.

Biography
When Demers was seventeen, she moved to Montreal and enrolled at McGill University, where she obtained a bachelor's degree in children's literature.  She went on to obtain a master's degree at the University of Québec and a doctorate at Université de Sherbrooke, both in the field of children's literature.  Demers also contributed to a postdoctoral study concerning children and the media for the Université de Montréal.  She taught at the Collège Charles-Lemoyne.

For fifteen years, Demers worked under L'actualité, Châtelaine, and Le Devoir as a journalist, where her contributions earned her the Judith-Jasmin Award in 1987.  In 1991, Demers wrote her first novel, a children's novel titled Dominique Picotée. The first of the "Alexis" series, the story of the novel was based on her three children: Simon, Alexis, and Marie.

Marie-Tempête was adapted into a television movie in 1998, dubbed Un hiver de tourmente, directed by Bernard Favre. Two of her later novels, La nouvelle Maîtresse and La Mystérieuse Bibliothécaire, were adapted into a film in 2002 as La mystérieuse mademoiselle C.  The film was directed by Richard Ciupka, with the screenplay written by Demers.  A sequel, L'incomparable mademoiselle C., followed in 2004 and is based on Une bien curieuse factrice and Une drôle de ministre.  There have also been plans to Maïna on the big screen.

For Radio-Canada, Demers hosted a children's show called Dominique raconte..., where she read approximately 150 books to young viewers. The show ran for three seasons under Téléfiction.

In 1997, the Université de Sherbrooke bestowed upon her the position of Ambassador.  In 2003, she was the first literary personality to be honoured by the Université du Québec à Montreal's Faculty of Letters and Communication. Demers was also awarded the Order of Canada in 2004. She was nominated numerous times for the Governor General's Award in 1992, 1993, and 1997.

She currently resides in Montreal with her husband, and spends her time writing in Laurentides.

Bibliography

Illustrated children's books 

 Pétunia princesse des pets
 Lustucru le loup qui pue
 Gratien Gratton prince de la gratouille
 Vieux Thomas et la petite fée
 Annabel et la bête
 L'oiseau des sables
 Aujourd'hui peut-être (also in English: Today, Maybe)
 Le Noël du petit Gnouf
 Le petit Gnouf et la magie de l'hiver
 La vérité sur les vraies princesses
 La pire journée de Papi
 Perline Pompette
 Le Zloukch
 Zachary et son Zloukch
 Le Gloubilouache
 Les Flipattes conteurs
 Le Cornichonnet gaffeur
 Le secret de Petit Poilu
 Petit Poilu chez les pioufs
 Tous les soirs du monde
 Boucle d'Or et les trois ours
 La plus belle histoire d'amour
 Oupilaille et le poil de dragon
 Oupilaille et le vélo rouge
 Le monde des GRANDS
 GÉANT, tu ne me fais p'as peur!
 Le clip de Cendrillon

Children's novels 

 Le secret des dragons
 Le chien secret de Poucet
 Poucet, le coeur en miettes

Alexis series 

 Valentine picotée
 Toto la brute
 Marie la chipie
 Roméo Lebeau
 Léon Maigrichon
 Alexa Gougougaga
 Macaroni en folie

Mlle Charlotte series 

 La Nouvelle Maitresse
 La Mystérieuse Bibliothécaire
 Une bien curieuse factrice
 Une drôle de ministre
 L'Étonnante Concierge
 La Fabuleuse Entraîneuse
 Une gouvernante épatante
  Le secret des dragons

Teen novels 

 L'élu
 Les trois voeux
 La pierre bleue
 Un hiver de tourmente
 Les grands sapins ne meurent pas
 Ils dansent dans la tempête
 Pour rallumer les étoiles
 Ta voix dans la nuit
 L'appel des loups
 Au pays de Natak

Adult novels 

 Là où la mer commence
 Maïna
 Le Pari
 Au bonheur de lire
 Marie-Tempête
 Pour rallumer les étoiles

Filmography

 Un hiver de tourmente - 1998
 The Mysterious Miss C. (La Mystérieuse mademoiselle C.) - 2002
 Dominique raconte... - 2003-2006
 The Incomparable Miss C. (L'incomparable mademoiselle C.) - 2004
 Maïna - 2013

References

External links
 
 

Canadian children's writers in French
Living people
1956 births
McGill University alumni
Université de Sherbrooke alumni
Canadian women children's writers
Franco-Ontarian people
Canadian novelists in French
20th-century Canadian novelists
20th-century Canadian women writers
21st-century Canadian novelists
21st-century Canadian women writers
20th-century Canadian screenwriters
21st-century Canadian screenwriters
Canadian screenwriters in French
Canadian women screenwriters
People from Hawkesbury, Ontario
Canadian women novelists